The 2014–15 Burkinabé Premier League is the 53rd edition of top flight football in Burkina Faso. A total of sixteen teams competed in the season beginning on 25 October 2014 and ending on 30 May 2015.

Teams 
ASFA 
ASF Bobo Dioulasso
Bankuy Sports 
Bobo Sport
Canon du Sud 
Comoé
Étoile Filante
Kadiogo 
KOZAF 
BPS Koudougou
Majestic
Ouagadougou
RC Bobo Dioulasso
Santos 
SONABEL
USFA

League table

References 

Premier League
Premier League
Burkina Faso
Burkinabé Premier League seasons